Kukal is a Czech and Slavic surname:
 Jan Kukal (born 1942)
  (born 1927)
 Olga Kukal
  (born 1964), Czech conductor
  (born 1970)
  (born 1932), Czech oceanologist, geologist and oceanographer

See also
 
 Kükəl, Azerbaijan

Czech-language surnames